Gustav Eriksson (13 March 1897 – 18 April 1974) was a Swedish weightlifter. He competed in the men's featherweight event at the 1920 Summer Olympics.

References

External links
 

1897 births
1974 deaths
Swedish male weightlifters
Olympic weightlifters of Sweden
Weightlifters at the 1920 Summer Olympics
Sportspeople from Örebro
20th-century Swedish people